There Goes My Girl is a 1937 American comedy film directed by Ben Holmes, written by Harry Segall, and starring Gene Raymond, Ann Sothern, Gordon Jones, Richard Lane, Frank Jenks and Bradley Page. It was released on May 21, 1937, by RKO Pictures.

Plot
When Jerry Martin and Connie Taylor, reporters for rival newspapers, fall in love, Taylor's Editor Tim Whelan sets up a fake murder to disrupt their wedding. Taylor insists on investigating the story, which causes a break-up with her fiancee. When the two reporters end up covering a real murder, Taylor attempts to reconcile her relationship, while Whelan attempts to break them up again.

Cast 
 Gene Raymond as Reporter Jerry Martin
 Ann Sothern as Reporter Connie Taylor
 Gordon Jones as Reporter Dunn
 Richard Lane as Editor Tim J. Whelan
 Frank Jenks as Reporter Frank 'George' Tate
 Bradley Page as Joe Rethburn 
 Joan Woodbury as Margot Whitney
 Marla Shelton as Mrs. Grace Andrews
 Alec Craig as 'Godfrey' 
 Joseph Crehan as Sgt. Wood
 William Corson as Dan Curtis
 Maxine Jennings as Miss Caldwell 
 Clyde Dilson as Actor Shot at Wedding
 Charles Coleman as Faraday
 Chester Clute as Stu Parker
 Roy James as Joe 
 Harry Worth as Henry

References

External links 
 
 
 
 

1937 films
American black-and-white films
RKO Pictures films
Films directed by Ben Holmes
American comedy films
1937 comedy films
1930s English-language films
1930s American films